The Hallowell family is an American family from Philadelphia and Boston, notable for their activism in the abolitionist movement and for their philanthropy to various universities and civil rights organizations. The Hallowell family is frequently associated with Boston Brahmins.

Notable members

17th century
 Benjamin Hallowell (1699–1773): A Boston merchant and one of the Kennebec Proprietors, holders of land originally granted to the Plymouth Company by the British monarchy in the 1620s. One of the largest owners in the Plymouth Company, Hallowell owned 50,000-acres at Hallowell, Maine. Benjamin’s grandson, Robert Hallowell, took the name of Gardiner on receiving the bulk of his grandfather's (Dr. Sylvester Gardiner's) large landed estate on the Kennebec.

18th century
 Sarah Hallowell (1727–1809): Early-American socialite, wife of Samuel Vaughan and mother of diplomat Benjamin Vaughan, merchant William Vaughan, and philanthropist John Vaughan, who developed Hallowell's lands on the Kennebec River, including the Vaughan Homestead. 
 Benjamin Hallowell Jr. (1725–1799): Commissioner of Customs for the Port of Boston during the Boston Tea Party, which Samuel Adams, a relation of his through marriage, helped organize. He married Mary Boylston, the daughter of Thomas Boylston, and a first cousin of Susanna Boylston, the mother of the 2nd President of the United States, John Adams, and grandmother of the 6th President, John Quincy Adams. His children included Ward Nicholas Boylston, Admiral Sir Benjamin Hallowell-Carew, and Mary, the wife of The Hon. John Elmsley, Chief Justice of Upper Canada.
Ward Nicholas Boylston (Hallowell) (1747–1828): Merchant and benefactor of Harvard.
Benjamin Hallowell Carew (1761–1834): A senior officer in the Royal Navy. He was a brother of Ward Nicholas Boylston and a nephew of Governor Moses Gill.
 Robert Hallowell Gardiner (1782–1864): City developer in Gardiner, Maine
 Benjamin Hallowell (educator) (1799–1877): The first president of the Maryland Agricultural College

19th century
 Edward Hallowell (1808–1860): Herpetologist
 Morris Longstreth Hallowell (1809–1880): Businessman, director of the Pennsylvania Railroad and the First National Bank. He was a founding member of the Union League of Philadelphia. He married Hannah Penrose, a first cousin of Charles B. Penrose.

 Caroline Hallowell Miller (1831–1905): The first president of the Maryland Woman Suffrage Association; her cousin, Issac Hallowell Clothier, was a co-founder of Strawbridge's.
 Anna Hallowell (1831–1905): Civil war nurse, anti-slavery activist, and the first woman elected to The Public Board of Education in Philadelphia. 
 Sarah Catherine Fraley Hallowell (1833–1914): Founder and first president of the New Century Club
 Richard Price Hallowell (1835–1904): Abolitionist, director of the National Bank of Commerce 
 Edward Needles Hallowell (1836–1871): Officer in the 54th Massachusetts regiment
 Norwood Penrose Hallowell (1839–1914): Colonel in the 54th Massachusetts regiment 
 James Reed Hallowell (1841–1898): Politician 
 Edwin Hallowell (1844–1916): Politician 
 Sarah Tyson Hallowell (1846–1924): Art curator
 May Hallowell Loud (1860–1916): Artist, suffragist and great granddaughter of Lucretia Mott.
 Elisabeth Hallowell Saunders (1861–1910): Photographer
 Frank Hallowell (1870–1933): Football player and coach
 Harriet Hallowell (1873–1943): French-American painter 
 Norwood Penrose Hallowell Jr (1875–1961): President of Lee, Higginson & Co.  
 John Hallowell (1878–1927): Football player and businessman 
 Alfred Irving Hallowell (1892–1974): Anthropologist, archaeologist, and businessman
 Hallowell Davis (1896–1992): Physiologist, otolaryngologist and researcher

20th century
 Norwood Penrose Hallowell III (1909–1979): Olympic runner 
 Edward Hallowell (born 1949): ADHD specialist and psychologist

References

External links
Hallowell Family Papers at the Massachusetts Historical Society

American families of English ancestry
Families from Massachusetts
Families from Pennsylvania
Hallowell, Maine